The United States Air Force's Strategic Air Command maintained many different types of wing in its forty-six years of history. 

See:List of ANG wings assigned to Strategic Air Command
See:List of USAF Bomb Wings and Wings assigned to Strategic Air Command
See:List of USAF Fighter Wings assigned to Strategic Air Command
See:List of USAF Provisional Wings assigned to Strategic Air Command
See:List of USAF Reconnaissance wings assigned to Strategic Air Command
See:List of USAF Strategic Wings assigned to the Strategic Air Command

References
 Mixer, Ronald E., Genealogy of the STRATEGIC AIR COMMAND, Battermix Publishing Company, 1999
 Mixer, Ronald E., STRATEGIC AIR COMMAND, An Organizational History, Battermix Publishing Company, 2006.

See also
List of Wings of the United States Air Force
List of MAJCOM Wings of the United States Air Force

 Wings